The Houthi tribe (literally "the tribe from Huth") is a Hamdanid Arab tribe that lives in northern Yemen. The tribe is a branch from Banu Hamdan tribe. They are primarily located in Amran and Sa'dah.

References

Yemeni tribes
History of the Houthis
Tribes of Arabia
Tribes of Saudi Arabia